Alberto Melloni (Reggio nell'Emilia, 6 January 1959) is an Italian church historian and a Unesco Chairholder of the Chair on Religious Pluralism & Peace, primarily known for his work on the Councils and the Second Vatican Council. Since 2020, he is one of the European Commission's Chief Scientific Advisors.

Career
He studied in Bologna, at Cornell and in Fribourg (Switzerland) and he has taught at the University of Bologna and Roma Tre University. He is currently Professor of the History of Christianity at the University of Modena-Reggio Emilia. Holder of the Unesco Chair on religious pluralism and peace, he is Director of the Fondazione per le scienze religiose “Giovanni XXIII” in Bologna.

He is principal investigator for the European Infraia Rei_Res project headed by the Fondazione, and coordinator of the Resilience research infrastructure project. He spearheaded the establishment of the European Academy of Religion. A research platform which includes institutions, associations, academies, publishers, reviews concerned with the study of religion throughout Europe, the Mediterrean, Middle East, the Balcans, Caucasus and Russia.

He worked on the History of the Second Vatican Council directed by Giuseppe Alberigo, and directed the Edizione nazionale dei diari di A.G. Roncalli (Istituto per le scienze religiose, Bologna 2003-2008), the Dizionario del sapere storico religioso del 900 (Il Mulino, Bologna 2010) and Cristiani d'Italia. Chiese, stato, società 1861-2011 (Treccani, Rome 2011).

He is chief editor for the project Conciliorum oecumenicorum generaliumqe decreta in Brepols's Corpus Christianorum and for the Mansi 3, a digital edition of all the church councils held in the course of history. He is responsible for the European research network on Pope Pius XI, and director of the Enciclopedia costantiniana for Treccani. He edited Benedetto XV. Papa Giacomo della Chiesa nel mondo dell'inutile strage, 2 voll. (il Mulino, Bologna 2017) and Lutero. Un cristiano fra riforme e modernità 2 voll. (il Mulino, Bologna 2017), also published in English and German by De Gruyter, 2017.

He has published works on medieval canon law, the church and the state in the twentieth century, on the Conclave. His most recent publications are: Papa Giovanni. Un cristiano e il suo concilio (Einaudi, Torino 2009), Pacem in terris. Storia dell'ultima enciclica di papa Giovanni (Laterza, Roma-Bari 2010), Le cinque perle di Giovanni Paolo II (Mondadori, Milano 2011).

He is an associate of the Accademia dei Lincei, honorary member of the Accademia Rubiconia, alderman for the Académie internationale des sciences religieuses, member of the scientific committee of the Enciclopedia Italiana, member of the trustees board for the celebrations of the 150th anniversary of Italy's unification, board member of Refo500, board member for the Dizionario biografico degli italiani, member of the international board for reviews such as the Revue d'histoire ecclésiastique in Leuven, Schweizerischen Zeitschrift für Religions- und Kulturgeschichte in Fribourg, and Studia Historiæ Ecclesiasticæ published by the University of South Africa.

He is working on La grande storia and special hosts for the national broadcasting History Channel. He has created and currently hosts Il sabbatico on Rainews24. He is also a columnist for both Il Corriere della Sera and La Repubblica.

Professor Melloni is a major contributor to the work on the Second Vatican Council led and promoted by the so-called “scuola di Bologna”. Its research mainly focused on the discontinuity hermeneutics, which differs from the official position of the Church according to a few Italian journalists. Pope Benedict XVI in fact states: "Discontinuity hermeneutics is likely to create an abrupt separation between the pre-conciliar and post-conciliar church". On the other hand, scholars related to the “scuola di Bologna” highlight the fact that the Pope's opinion does not centre exclusively on continuity. According to Melloni it is impossible to read the Pope's words as a mere post-conciliar repentance.

In 2020, Professor Melloni was appointed as Chief Scientific Advisor to the European Commission, one of a group of seven as part of the Scientific Advice Mechanism.

Selected bibliography

Books
Le cinque perle di Giovanni Paolo II, Milano, Mondadori 2011
Papa Giovanni. Un cristiano e il suo concilio, Torino, Einaudi 2009
La storia che giudica la storia che assolve, saggi di O. Marquard e A. Melloni, Roma-Bari, Laterza 2008
L'inizio di papa Ratzinger. Lezioni sul conclave del 2005 e sull'incipit del pontificato di Benedetto XVI, Torino 2006
Chiesa madre, chiesa matrigna. Un discorso storico sul cristianesimo che cambia, Torino 2004
Il conclave. Storia di una istituzione, Bologna 2001, 298 pp.; tr.ted. Freiburg a.M. 2002; tr.sp. Madrid 2002; tr.port. Rio de Janeiro 2002; tr.fr. Paris 2003; tr.pol. Warszawa 2004; (ried. Il conclave. Storia dell'elezione del papa, Bologna 2005)
L'altra Roma. Politica e S. Sede durante il concilio Vaticano II (1959–1965), Bologna 2000
Il Giornale dell'Anima di Giovanni XXIII, Milano 2000
Tra Istanbul, Atene e la guerra. A.G. Roncalli vicario e delegato apostolico (1935–1944), Genova (Marietti) 1993, 325 pp.
Innocenzo IV. La concezione e l'esperienza della cristianità come regimen unius personæ, prefazione di B. Tierney, Genova, Marietti 1990

Critical editions
 Corpus Christianorum - Conciliorum œcumenicorum generaliumqe decreta, ed. G. Alberigo et A. Melloni, Turnhout  2007 vol. 1; 2010 vol. 3; 2011 vol. 2, 2013 vol. 4-5
 Cronache sociali, 1947-1951, edizione anastatica integrale e introduzione a cura di Alberto Melloni , Bologna (Istituto per le scienze religiose) 2007, 1893 pp. con DVD
 Angelo G. Roncalli-Giovanni XXIII, «Il Giornale dell'Anima», Edizione critica ed annotazione a cura di Alberto Melloni , Bologna (Istituto per le scienze religiose) 2002m 545 pp. (I ed. 1987, 802 pp.)
 Dietrich Bonhoeffer, Poesie , a cura di A. Melloni, Bose 1999
 M.-D. Chenu, Notes quotidiennes au Concile , Paris 1995, pp. 7–54; [tr.it. Bologna 1996]
 Angelo G. Roncalli-Giovanni XXIII, La predicazione ad Istanbul. Omelie, discorsi e note pastorali (1935-1944), a cura di Alberto Melloni, Firenze (L.S. Olschki) 1993, 420 pp.
 Giuseppe Dossetti, La ricerca costituente. Interventi 1945-1952 , Bologna 1994

See also
Giuseppe Dossetti
Pope John XXIII
Pope John Paul II
Pope Innocent IV
Marie-Dominique Chenu
Dietrich Bonhoeffer

Notes

External links
 Fondazione per le scienze religiose “Giovanni XXIII”
 Corpus Christianorum
 European Academy of Religion

20th-century Italian historians
1959 births
Living people
21st-century Italian historians
Academic staff of the University of Modena and Reggio Emilia